Highbury Korfball Club (HKC) is a korfball club based in North London, England and is a member of the England Korfball Association.  Highbury Korfball Club succeeded Arsenal Korfball Club, which was established by Hugh Barker in 1998.  Rebranding occurred to avoid confusion with the football team of the same name.

With six teams, HKC competes across a range from highly competitive to highly social indoor Korfball leagues, generally in the London area during the winter months. During the summer, Highbury competes at many standards in tournaments held over weekends throughout the UK. HKC has also made trips to various European countries to play in tournaments abroad against local teams and those from further afield. The summer tournaments are often but not always played outdoors.

League history

2003–2006

The club became established in the London Leagues.

2006–2007 

In the season of 2006–07, Highbury expanded to become a 2 team club including 4 Australian's who did Highbury and Australia proud as they participated in the Commonwealth & Friends Korfball Tournament that was held in Croydon during the summer of 2006.

2007–2008 

In the season of 2006–07, Highbury expanded to become a 3 team club. To ensure the quality rose with the quantity, Highbury travelled to the Netherlands once again to compete in an outdoor tournament but this time took in a couple of extra days to participate in a training camp run for Highbury's benefit by Mart Huijbregts. Highbury looked internally to strengthen its coaching staff base and subsidised that attendance of two of its members to the annual Avon Tyrell Level 2 Coaching Qualification course.

2008–2009 

In the season of 2008–2009, Highbury expanded to become a 4 team club.
This was the year that the EKA disbanded the National Reserve and National Division 1 Leagues and introduced a new Regional League structure. Highbury took their place in the new structure by competing in the newly formed South East Regional League.
For the first time, Highbury brought in an external full-time coach to train the elite squad; Tamara Burnell, a National Premiere League player with Bec KC and Scottish representative was given the job which also included training the players of Highbury 2 which competed in the London 1st Division.

Highbury 3 swept aside most opposition in the London 3rd division only losing two games, both by a single goal but a scheduling technicality lead to a game being forfeited and the title slipping from their grasp. There could be no hard feelings though as the eventual winners of the league, Supernova 2, were the only team not to suffer defeat at the hands of Highbury 3 with the head-to-head battles resulting in a draw and a single goal win to Supernova.

2009–2010 

During the 2009–2010 season Highbury welcomed the news that London would form their own Region due to the restructuring of Regional Leagues. Pre-season Highbury were looking for a new head coach and Laurie Swan, head coach on Supernova KC, stepped in to assist the club with player selection during the month running up to the season start while a coach was sought. Before the season was under way, Stuart Ironmonger, a National Premier League player and coach with a successful history took the role of head coach. Highbury played in the London Regional League (LRL) and was represented with a team in each of Divisions 2, 3 and 4 of the London Korfball Association (LKA).
Highbury put in many good performances and clinched a proud second place in the LRL behind winners Bec 2. Thus, achieving their goal of beating Croydon KC in to the single position awarded to the LRL in the annual Champions Trophy (Bec 2 were ineligible as Bec were already playing in the National League). While Highbury didn't win promotion into the National League they did show throughout the Champions Trophy that they could compete with the teams that were being promoted in to the top league in the country.

Meanwhile, in the LKA, Highbury 4 were regularly requiring to field two players from the higher leagues to form a complete and legal team. While this was completely within the rules of the LKA, the LKA committee decided to withdraw Highbury 4 from their league without notice.

2010–2011 

Andrew Speck was elected chair. The club maintained 3 teams although there was an exodus of men from the regional league team as they moved out of London for employment opportunities.

The 1st and 2nd teams finished mid table in the London Regional League and London League 2, however Highbury 3 won promotion to London League 2 for the coming season.

2011–2012 

Ben Hale took over as Chairman for the season. Martin Petrie (of Supernova) provided coaching for the first and second teams with Moses Hutchinson-Pascal acting as third team and development coach.

Highbury 3 struggled in LKA2, however did well to finish outside of the relegation places, but the decision was made to volunteer to drop a division to give the players a better chance to develop against similarly skilled players.

Highbury 2 again finished mid table but 4th place was an improvement on the prior season. Rachel Dixon also topped the Girls Scoring chart with 30 goals in the season.

Highbury 1 finished fourth in the LRL and qualified for the Champions Trophy as the three teams above them already had teams in the National League. Julia Hall finished top of the Scoring chart for the girls with 31 fine goals in her final full season at Highbury before moving back to New Zealand at the end of 2012.

At the Champions Trophy, Highbury competed against the best teams around the country and came a respectful 4th place with wins over Manchester Warriors and Bristol City.

2012–2013 

Simon Mackie was elected at the AGM as Chairman for the season. Andrew Speck stepped into coaching the first and second teams with fellow Aussie Ben Hale taking on the role of third team and development coach. The club was training at Old Street during this season.

Highbury 3 came third in the first season back in LKA3, with many new players developing well.

Highbury 2 also finished in the top 3 in LKA too, with several players stepping up into the second team from the prior year's thirds showing Highbury's knack for developing new players.

Highbury 1 finished 5th despite Joanna Faure Walker finishing joint top scorer of the girls and qualified again for the Champions Trophy for the second year in a row. This season sees a record Highbury win of 31–8 over Mitcham, with Moses Hutchinson-Pascal getting a triple hat trick.

At the Champions Trophy Highbury finish 5th despite beating eventual runners up Birmingham who were promoted to the National League.

2013–2014 

Joanna Faure Walker takes the role of Chair with Andrew Speck continuing to provide coaching to the squad.

The club moves into two new venues in Swiss Cottage and Stoke Newington ahead of the new season to improve training facilities available to the squad and wider club.

Good recruitment over summer means that Highbury 4 are started up again, playing friendly matches this season in the hope of entering another team into the league the year after.

The club recruited several new players both at the top level (including several Portuguese and Dutch players) and beginners. The teams performed well with Highbury 1 again qualifying for the Champions Trophy after finishing 4th in the Regional League, Highbury 2 having a best ever finish of 2nd in LKA2 and Highbury 3 and 4 improving in LKA3.

At the Champions Trophy Highbury again finish 5th despite some good performances against the best teams from around the country.

The club goes on tour to Lisbon, Portugal led by Tiago Almeida to take part in the 14th Annual Korfball Tournament organised by Clube Corfebol Oeiras, with Highbury finishing in 5th, 8th and 14th places.

2014–2015 

Rich Hayward is elected role of Chair. Andrew Speck continues to coach the 1st and 2nd team squad whilst Tiago Almeida assumes the position of head coach for the 3rd and 4th teams

The club continues to train at Swiss Cottage whilst the squad move to Petchey Academy in Dalston in order to enable weekly squad sessions to be able to take place.

The summer sees some of Highbury's established members leave the club for pastures new outside of North London, but another strong summer of recruitment sees the depth in the squad enhanced. Players join the club from all over the country from Nottingham to Norwich bringing their experience in to heighten competition for places.

This year sees Highbury 1 competing in the newly formed England South and East Promotional Division against a higher calibre of opposition for a place in the Champions Trophy.

Highbury 1 finish 4th in the S&E Promo league and 3rd in the London Regional League, Highbury 2 finish 4th in LKA 2 and Highbury 3 & 4 playoff for 3rd place in LKA 3 with the Highbury 3 running out 7–4 winners.

2015–2016 

Rich Hayward continues as Chair. Steph Allen (of Trojans and England) becomes the new squad coach.

The club trains in Finsbury Park over summer in order to try to attract more passing trade and promote the club.

The club and squad both train and play matches in Petchey Academy in Dalston this season, marking the first time the club has played its home games in North London for years.

Highbury 1 compete again for the London Regional League and South & East Promo League, whilst Highbury 3 are promoted to LKA Division 2 alongside Highbury 2. Highbury 4 continue to develop in LKA Division 3.

Highbury 1 finish 3rd in the Promo League (despite an excellent 16 - 8 win over the eventually promoted Bearsted) and 4th in the Regional League, a good result given a new coach and a whole host of new players in the squad.

Highbury 2 finished 3rd in LKA 2 despite being in contention to win the league with 2 games remaining, and Highbury 3 went on a 5 match unbeaten run to secure 6th place (including a 9-goal game from new signing Tom Rich).

Highbury 4 finished 8th in LKA 3 but with many new players getting experience. With the new influx Highbury have entered a 5th team into the league for 2016-17

2016–2017 

Rich Hayward continued as chair for one more year. Steph Watson (née Allen) continued in the role of head coach, with Darryl Light and Rosie Oxenbury becoming the development coaches.

The club again trained in Finsbury Park in the summer, having forged a close link with The Finsbury pub which provided both a location to store equipment and the post training social venue.

The Petchey Academy remained home for both squad and club training, with Highbury 1 playing their Promotion League fixtures in Trinity School of John Whitgift due to size restrictions.

This season marked the first full season for Highbury 5 competing in London League 3.

Highbury 1 finish 3rd in the Promo League, missing out in the final game of the league and 3rd in the Regional League, an improvement on the previous year.

Highbury 2 finished 2nd in LKA 2 after finishing equal on points to rivals Supernova 2 but behind on head to head results, and Highbury 3 finished in 5th improving on the 6th-place finish from the year before.

Highbury 4 finished 2nd in LKA 3B and promise to be pushing for promotion next season, with Highbury 5 finishing 4th in the same league.

2017–2018 

James Sipthorpe (formerly Development) is elected chair. Steph Watson (née Allen) is on maternity leave so Toby Clarke (of Trojans Korfball Club) is the coach for the squad for this season, with Darryl Light and Rosie Oxenbury continuing as the development coaches. Helen Gilmore is appointed as the club coach for both the 5th team and beginners, utilising her experience with new players having set up Essex Blades (the korfball club of the University of Essex).

The club trained in Finsbury Park in the summer and found success in many outdoor tournaments including winning in Bristol, runners up in Leicester and coming 3rd in an international tournament in Nitra, in Slovakia.

All teams continues to train at the Petchey Academy with expanded sessions for the development squad every week, meaning that the club is now running 3 sessions per week at the venue.

A very successful season for the club as Highbury 1 finish 1st in the Promo League and headed to the Copper Box for promotion playoffs against Bristol Thunder, Manchester Warriors and Norwich City. Despite winning their first two games, a loss to Manchester Warriors in the final game of the day sent up Bristol Thunder to the EKL on goal difference.

Highbury 2 finished 1st in LKA 2 after completing a 100% winning season and winning promotion, and Highbury 3 finished in 3rd in LKA2 improving on the 5th-place finish from the year before.

Highbury 4 finished 2nd in LKA 3 (behind Bec 5 who utilised several guest players) meaning they are also promoted, with Highbury 5 finishing 3rd in the same league.

2018–2019 

James Sipthorpe remains as chair. Steph Watson returns from maternity leave as squad coach, with Rosie Oxenbury becoming the sole development coach to save on costs. Helen Gilmore continues as the club coach.

The club made a trip to Paris alongside other summer tournaments to play in an international tournament in Massy, Essonne. Highbury ended up as runner ups in the tournament, beating the Armenia national korfball team on the way to the final where they narrowly lost to the France national korfball team.

All teams continues to train at the Petchey Academy on Tuesday, Wednesday and Thursday nights.

Highbury 1 once again qualify for the end of season Play-Offs to earn a spot in the National League. In their semi-final match they come from behind to secure a 24-22 victory over Manchester Warriors, with Southampton Spartans defeating Bearsted in the other semi-final the two meet in the final on 2 June at the Copper Box. Despite leading for almost the entire match, Highbury fall behind with 5 minutes to go; Beth Penhaligon scores to level the match at 17-17 before Oliver Cusack clinches the final goal with 30 seconds left on the clock to make it 18-17 to Highbury and earning them their first ever spot in the National League.

Highbury 2 had a strong first season in the LRL, finishing in mid table 6th place in their debut season. Highbury 3 finished top of LKA2, a year after the 2nds had done the same, and would be promoted to the LRL in the next season.

Highbury 4 finished mid table in LKA2 after their promotion the previous year. Highbury 5 finished 7th in a strong LKA3 league.

2019–2020 

Craig Hilton (former Referees officer) became the chair. Steph Watson started the season on maternity leave, so Darryl Light stepped in as squad coach for the first part of the season. Chris Thompson became the development coach as he was unable to continue playing due to injury issues and thus could attend more matches and focus solely on developing the players without the distraction of playing. Dennis Hartsink became the new club coach.

All teams continues to train at the Petchey Academy on Tuesday, Wednesday and Thursday nights.

Squad (2019/2020)
 Ally Glennie,  Bernard Martin,  Darryl Light,   Dennis Hartsink,  James Sipthorpe,  James Gourlay,  Jean Fourie, 
 George Rourke,  George Fitzgerald,  Hugh Lo,  Oliver Cusack,  Steve Carter,  Wenny Manuel

 Amy Redston,  Beth Penhaligon,  Cassie Bode,  Hannah Fallows,  Helen Gilmore,  Jordie Wildin
 Joy Visser,  Kate Sherring,  Rachel Burt,  Rosie Oxenbury,  Sarah Munro,  Sissel Farje

 Head coach     Steph Watson
 Development coach     Chris Thompson
 Club coach     Dennis Hartsink

Past Squads

Squad (2018/2019)
 Ally Glennie,  Bernard Martin,  Darryl Light,   Dennis Hartsink,  James Sipthorpe,  Jean Fourie, 
 Moses Hutchinson-Pascal,  Oliver Cusack,  Steve Carter,  Wenny Manuel

 Amy Redston,  Beth Penhaligon,  Emily Cocker,  Frances Holligan,  Hannah Fallows
 Helen Gilmore,  Kate Sherring,  Rachel Burt,  Rosie Oxenbury,  Sarah Munro

 Head coach     Steph Watson
 Development coach     Rosie Oxenbury
 Club coach     Helen Gilmore

Squad (2017/2018)
 Ally Glennie,  Bernard Martin,  Chris Thompson,  Darryl Light,  James Sipthorpe
 Karthik Ramulu,  Moses Hutchinson-Pascal,  Steve Carter,  Tom Kim,  Tom Rich

 Amy Redston,  Cassie Bode,  Hannah Ackerley,  Helen Gilmore,  Isabel Emburey,  Kelly Lippett
 Kate Sherring,  Niccola Hutchinson-Pascal (née Hyslop),  Rachel Burt,  Rosie Oxenbury,  Sarah Munro

 Head coach     Toby Clarke
 Development coaches   Darryl Light &  Rosie Oxenbury
 Club coach     Helen Gilmore

Squad (2016/2017)
 Ally Glennie,  Bernard Martin,  Chris Thompson,  Darryl Light,  James Sipthorpe
 Moses Hutchinson-Pascal,  Oliver Cusack,  Pasindu De Silva,  Steve Carter,  Tom Rich

 Amy Redston,  Anja Hudson,  Emma Butterworth,  Helen Gilmore,  Kelly Lippett
 Kamilla Dombai,  Kate Sherring,  Niccola Hyslop,  Rosie Oxenbury,  Vicki Gee

 Head coach     Steph Allen
 Development coaches   Darryl Light &  Rosie Oxenbury

Squad (2015/2016)
 Andrew Speck,  Bernard Martin,  Darryl Light,  Matthew Dodds,  Michael Stephenson,  Moses Hutchinson-Pascal
 Oliver Cusack,  Pasindu De Silva,  Rich Hayward,  Steve Carter,  Tim Farr

 Amy Redston,  Anja Hudson,  Emma Butterworth,  Hannah Evans,  Jo-Anne Wilson,  Inge Carrington
 Kamilla Dombai,  Kate Sherring,  Niccola Hyslop,  Rosie Oxenbury,  Vicki Gee

 Head coach  Steph Allen
 Development coach   Martin Petrie

Squad (2014/2015)
 Alun Perkins,  Bernard Martin,  Darryl Light,  Jean Silva Ayres,  Karthik Ramulu,  Matthew Dodds
 Mike Shute,  Moses Hutchinson-Pascal,  Rennan Ayres Fonseca,  Rich Hayward,  Will Tiddy

 Amy Redston,  Ana Rocha,  Anja Hudson,  Eleanor Kentish,  Inge Carrington,  Jayde Cook
 Leonie Ansems De Vries,  Mirelle Geervliet,  Niccola Hyslop,  Sarah-Louise Burgess,  Zoe Sprakes

 Head coach  Andrew Speck
 Development coach   Tiago Almeida

Squad (2013/2014)
 Alun Perkins,  Conor O'Boyle,  Darryl Light,  Hans Van Andel,  Martin Petrie,  Matthew Dodds
 Mike Shute,  Moses Hutchinson-Pascal,  Simon Mackie,  Tiago Almeida

 Amy Redston,  Ana Rocha,  Joanna Faure Walker,  Judith Mitchell,  Leonie Ansems De Vries
 Marrit Nijmeijer,  Morven Masterton,  Niccola Hyslop,  Rachel Dixon,  Sara Rocha,  Sarah-Louise Burgess

 Head coach  Andrew Speck
 Development coach  Martin Petrie &  Darryl Light

Squad (2012/2013)
 Andrew Speck,  Ben Hale,  Gawain Bosworth,  Darryl Light,  Moses Hutchinson-Pascal
 Craig Morgan,  Robert Van Someren,  Shah Munir,  Simon Mackie

 Sara Collinge,  Judith Mitchell,  Joanna Faure Walker,  Julia Hall,  Morven Masterton
 Niccola Hyslop,  Olga Caselton,  Rachel Dixon,  Sarah-Louise Burgess

 Head coach  Andrew Speck
 Development coach  Ben Hale

Squad (2011/2012)
 Andrew Speck,  Ben Hale,  Dai Lowe,  Gawain Bosworth,  Matthew Burnell
 Moses Hutchinson-Pascal,  Neil Blain,  Shah Munir,  Simon Mackie

 Ellie Simes,  Judith Mitchell,  Joanna Faure Walker,  Julia Hall,  Morven Masterton
 Niccola Hyslop,  Olga Sanderova,  Rachel Dixon,  Sophie Scott

 Head coach  Martin Petrie
 Development coach  Moses Hutchinson-Pascal

Squad (2010/2011)
 Andrew Speck,  Ben Hale,  Gawain Bosworth,  Mark Thornhill,  Matthew Burnell,  Moses Hutchinson-Pascal
 Neil Blain,  Richard Rawstron,  Sebastien Bardin,  Shah Munir,  Simon Mackie

 Edith Hornick,  Ellie Simes,  Joanna Faure Walker,  Maite Vermeulen,  Julia Hall,  Kim Midwood
 Morven Masterton,  Niccola Hyslop,  Olga Sanderova,  Rachel Dixon,  Sophie Scott

 Head coach  Ben Hale (plus Arnaud Chevalier, Moses Hutchinson-Pascal), Assistant coach  Toby Catlin
 Development coach  Neil Blain

Squad (2009/2010)
 Andrew Speck,  Ben McGrath,  Fergus Campbell,  Gawain Bosworth,  Mark Thornhill
 Moses Hutchinson-Pascal,  Neil Blain,  Shah Munir,  Thomas Johannsen

 Edith Hornick,  Joanna Faure Walker,  Julia Hall,  Kim Midwood,  Morven Marstenson
 Niccola Hyslop,  Olga Sanderova,  Rachel Dixon,  Sophie Scott

 Head coach  Stuart Ironmonger, Assistant coach  Ben Hale
 Development coach  Sophie Robins

Honours

2018/19 Highbury win the promotional playoff and are promoted to EKL Premier Division
 2018/19 Highbury 3 are champions of LKA 2 and are promoted to LRL
 2017/18 Highbury 2 are champions of LKA 2 and are promoted to LRL
 2017/18 Highbury 4 are promoted to LKA 2
 2014/15 Highbury 3 are promoted to LKA 2
 2013/14 Highbury qualifies for the Champions Trophy as the highest placed eligible London team
 2012/13 Highbury qualifies for the Champions Trophy as the highest placed eligible London team
 2011/12 Highbury qualifies for the Champions Trophy as the highest placed eligible London team
 2010/11 Highbury 3 are promoted to LKA 2
 2009/10 Highbury qualifies for the Champions Trophy as the highest placed eligible London team
 2007/8 Highbury champions of the LKA Premier League; Highbury 2 champions of LKA 2nd Division

International Representation

 2016 Jo-Anne Wilson represented England U23 at the IKF U23 World Korfball Championship, Olomouc, Czech Republic
 2009 Edith Hornick represented Luxembourg at the Eurobowl, Western Conference, Luxembourg.
 2007 Ben Hale represented Australia at the World Championship, Brno, Czech Republic.
 2006 Tom Bukojemski, Ben Hale, Natalie Shield and Andrew Speck represented Australia at the inaugural Commonwealth Championships, Croydon, London, UK.

Internal posts and awards

References

External links
Highbury's website
England Korfball
Sky Sports korfball news segment

Korfball teams in England
Sports clubs in London
Sports clubs established in 1998